The politics of Saint Pierre and Miquelon take place in the framework of a parliamentary representative democratic French overseas collectivity, whereby the President of the Territorial Council is the head of government, and of a multi-party system. Executive power is exercised by the government.

Executive branch
The head of state is the President of France, currently Emmanuel Macron. The President is represented in the collectivity by the Prefect of Saint Pierre & Miquelon (French: Préfet) a position currently held by Christian Pouget. The role of the prefect is equivalent to the role of a governor or governor general in English speaking territories.

Legislative branch
The Territorial Council of Saint-Pierre and Miquelon, which was known until February 22, 2007, as the General Council (Conseil général), has 19 members, elected for a three-year term in single seat constituencies. The council sits at the Territorial Council Building, a two-storey, two tone aqua colour building on St. Pierre.

Municipal Governments
There are two levels of local government: Miquelon-Langlade and Saint-Pierre.

For more, see: Municipal governments in St. Pierre and Miquelon

Judicial Branch
The judiciary of the territory consists of the Superior Tribunal of Appeals (Tribunal Superieur d'Appel).

The court resides at the Palais de Justice or Courthouse and are located at Church Square in St. Pierre.

Departments
The following is list of departments of St. Pierre and Miquelon. (Some are the local branch of national departments):

 La Direction de l'Agriculture et de la Foret - Department of Agriculture and Forests
 Le Service des Affaires Maritimes - Marine Department
 La Direction de l'Equipement - Infrastructure or Public Works
 Le Service du Travail, de l'Emploi et de la Formation Professionnelle - Labour and Employment Department
 La Direction Territoriale la Jeunesse et des Sports - Local Sports and Youth Department
 La Direction des Affaires Sanitaires et Sociales - Health and Social Affairs
 Le Service de l'Education Nationale - Education Department
 La Douane - Customs Department
 La Direction des Services Fiscaux - Finance Department
 La Gendarmerie Nationale - Local unit of the French Ministry of Defence
 La Gendarmerie Maritime : Le Fulmar - Marine Police (local branch of Maritime Gendarmerie)
 La Direction de la Concurrence, de la Consommation et de la Répression des Fraudes - Consumer Protection Department
 L'Aviation Civile - local branch of the Directorate General for Civil Aviation (France)
 La Police Nationale - local branch of the National Police (France)

Political parties and elections

Boundary dispute

In 1992, a maritime boundary dispute with Canada over the delineation of the Exclusive Economic Zone belonging to France was settled by the International Court of Arbitration.  In the decision, France kept the 12 nautical mile (NM) (22.2 km) territorial sea surrounding the islands and was given an additional 12 NM (22.2 km) contiguous zone as well as a 10.5 NM (19.4 km) wide corridor stretching 200 NM (370 km) south.  The total area in the award was 18% of what France had requested.

The boundary dispute had been a flash point for Franco-Canadian relations. New claims made under UNCLOS by France over the continental shelf might cause new tensions between France and Canada.

International organization participation
Franc Zone, World Federation of Trade Unions

External links
  
Saint-Pierre & Miquelon Tourism
Saint-Pierre & Miquelon Community website, includes political discussions
Saint-Pierre & Miquelon Continental Plate  - "Defend Saint-Pierre & Miquelon"

Political parties
Archipel demain
Cap sur l'avenir

References